Uruli railway station is a small railway station in Pune district, Maharashtra. Its code is URI. It serves Uruli Kanchan a suburban area of the city. The station consists of two platforms. Some part of the platform is sheltered. Basic facilities like water, sanitation are available. The main railway station of the city, Pune Junction, is always preferred over Uruli station for catching several trains. This station is only suitable for local travelling within Pune City. There is also plan to start suburban trains on Pune–Daund section. This station will be a major station for Pune–Daund suburban trains.

See also
 
 
 
 Pune Suburban Railway

References

Pune Suburban Railway
Railway stations in Pune
Pune railway division
Railway stations in Pune district